The Movement for Democracy was a political party in Slovakia created in 2002 when it split from the Movement for a Democratic Slovakia. From 2002 to 2004 the first leader of the party was Ivan Gašparovič, who served as president of Slovakia from 2004 to 2014. The leader since 2004 was Jozef Grapa.

In the parliamentary election of 17 June 2006, the party won 0.6% of the popular vote and lost parliamentary representation. Movement for Democracy was part of the Alliance for Europe of the Nations from 2002 to 2009.

After 2010, the party became inactive, but not formally disbanded. Its shell was taken over by Peter Marček who renamed it to "Voice of the People" (Hlas Ľudu) in December 2018. The party was later renamed to Republic.

Leaders

See also
 List of political parties in Slovakia

Party site
Official website of the Movement for Democracy (archived in 2008)

Conservative parties in Slovakia